Basnahira South cricket team is one of the five provincial cricket teams which make up the Sri Lankan domestic cricket structure representing southern region of Western province. Basnahira South is based in Colombo.The cricket team participate in the two provincial tournaments: the first-class cricket competition known as the Inter-Provincial Tournament, and the Twenty20 competition known as the Inter-Provincial Twenty20. They also participated in the 2007/08 Inter-Provincial Limited Overs Tournament. The tournament is defunct now. The top 75 players of the Premier Limited Overs Tournament take part in the Inter-Provincial tournament.

The team plays their home matches in Colombo Sinhalese Sports Club Ground and Tyronne Fernando Stadium in Moratuwa. Tillakaratne Dilshan is the captain of the side. Prasanna Jayawardene, Malinda Warnapura and Chamara Silva are some of the other current Test cricketers in the side.

2008/09 season
Basnahira South did not qualify for this year's finals Inter-Provincial Tournament. Although they did better in the Inter-Provincial Twenty20 tournament. They had the chance to qualify for the inaugural Twenty20 Champions League. Despite entering the finals unbeaten Basnhira South, collapsed from a strong position of 133 for 1, losing their last nine wickets for just eleven runs. Wayamba chased down the target with six balls remaining and qualified for the Twenty20 Champions League.

Name and participation
From the early years of the Inter-Provincial tournament to 2004/05 season teams used English names. But from 2007/08 onwards the teams were named in Sinhalese. From its inception of the tournament Western Province presented more than one team to the tournament except for 2003/04	and 2004/05 seasons. Since then Western province teams became known as Basnahira North and Basnahira South. Basnahira is Sinhalese for West. Number of teams representing Western province varied from season to season and their names also. Teams represented Western Province for the each tournament given below.

Notable players
The following is a list of players who have represented both Basnahira South and Sri Lanka.

Current squad
The squad for the 2008–09 season as of 22 March 2009.

||  || Tillakaratne Dilshan (Captain) ||  32 ||  All-rounder ||  RHB ||  OS
|-
||  || Chamara Silva ||  29 ||  Batsman ||  RHB ||  LS
|-
||  || Malinga Bandara ||  29 ||  Bowler ||  RHB ||  LS
|-
||  || Charith Sylvester ||  26 ||  Wicket keeper ||  LHB ||  
|-
||  || Hasantha Fernando ||  29 ||  All-rounder ||  RHB ||  RMF
|-
||  || Janaka Gunaratne ||  28 ||  All-rounder ||  RHB ||  OS
|-
||  || Prasanna Jayawardene ||  29 ||  Wicket keeper ||  RHB ||  
|-
||  || Suranga Lakmal ||  22 ||  Bowler ||  RHB ||  RMF
|-
||  || Chinthaka Perera ||  24 ||  Bowler ||  RHB ||  RFM
|-
||  || Dilruwan Perera ||  26 ||  Bowler ||  RHB ||  OS
|-
||  || Gihan Rupasinghe ||  23 ||  Batsman ||  LHB ||  LS
|-
||  || Milinda Siriwardana ||  23 ||  All-rounder ||  LHB ||  LO
|-
||  || Lahiru Thirimanne ||  19 ||  Batsman ||  LHB ||  RMF
|-
||  || Malinda Warnapura ||  29 ||  Batsman ||  LHB ||  OS
|-this guneratne
|}
|}

Honours

Inter-Provincial Tournament
Inter-Provincial Limited Overs Tournament
Inter-Provincial Twenty20

References

Former senior cricket clubs of Sri Lanka